Víctor García Marín (born 31 May 1994) is a Spanish professional footballer who plays for Polish club Śląsk Wrocław mainly as a left winger but also as a left wing-back.

Club career
Born in L'Hospitalet de Llobregat, Barcelona, Catalonia, García made his senior debut with UE Cornellà in 2012, in Tercera División. In July he moved to RCD Espanyol, where he finished his youth career.

In the summer of 2013, García joined Segunda División B club AE Prat. He appeared in 19 matches during the season, and signed for CD Tenerife's reserves on 2 July 2014.

García made his professional debut on 14 December 2014, coming on as a second-half substitute in a 0–0 away draw against AD Alcorcón. He was handed his first start on 10 January of the following year, also providing an assist for Diego Ifrán's goal in the 3–1 away loss to Real Betis.

On 22 February 2015, García scored his first goal in the second division, the last in a 2–0 home victory over Real Valladolid. On 23 July he renewed his link with the Canarians, being immediately loaned to CF Pobla de Mafumet of the third tier.

On 17 July 2016, after terminating his contract with Tenerife, García moved to CF Badalona. He continued competing at that level in the following years, representing in quick succession UCAM Murcia CF, CD Ebro and CD Castellón.

References

External links

1994 births
Living people
Spanish footballers
Footballers from L'Hospitalet de Llobregat
Association football wingers
Segunda División players
Segunda División B players
Tercera División players
UE Cornellà players
AE Prat players
CD Tenerife B players
CD Tenerife players
CF Pobla de Mafumet footballers
CF Badalona players
UCAM Murcia CF players
CD Ebro players
CD Castellón footballers
Ekstraklasa players
Śląsk Wrocław players
Spanish expatriate footballers
Expatriate footballers in Poland
Spanish expatriate sportspeople in Poland